The 1995–96 Olympique de Marseille season was the club's 97th season in existence and the second consecutive season in the top flight of French football. In addition to the domestic league, Marseille participated in this season's editions of the Coupe de France and the Coupe de la Ligue.

Competitions

Overview

French Division 2

League table

Results summary

Results by round

Matches

Source:

Coupe de France

Coupe de la Ligue

Statistics

Goalscorers

References

External links
 

Olympique de Marseille seasons
Olympique de Marseille